Gratiola officinalis, the gratiole, common hedgehyssop, grace of God, Gratia Dei, hedge hyssop, hedge-hyssop, or herb of grace, is an ornamental plant in the family Plantaginaceae. It is a rhizomatous perennial herb native to Europe.

References

External links
Gratiola officinalis

officinalis
Medicinal plants of Europe
Flora of Ukraine
Plants described in 1753
Taxa named by Carl Linnaeus
Herbs